Arende, is a 1994 South African drama film directed by Dirk de Villiers. The film stars Ian Roberts and Gavin van den Berg in lead roles along with Diane Wilson, Keith Grenville and Percy Sieff in supportive roles.

The film revolves a set during the Anglo Boer War and life of rebellious Boer farmer Sloet Steenkamp and Captain of the British Army James Kerwin.  The film received positive reviews and won several awards at international film festivals.

Cast
 Ian Roberts as Sloet Steenkamp
 Gavin van den Berg as Capt. James Kerwin
 Brian O'Shaughnessy as Sgt. Stewart
 James White as Dr. John Moston-Smythe
 Keith Grenville as Governor Andrew Wilks
 Diane Wilson as Mary Wilks
 Jocelyn Broderick as Jo-Ann Wilks
 Michelle Botes as Princess Gobbler
 Percy Sieff as Benny Mentz
 Johan Esterhuizen as Buks Retief
 Libby Daniels as Annette Steenkamp
 André Roodtman as P.J. Buys
 Hennie Oosthuizen as Commandant Hendrik Keet
 Limpie Basson as Petrus Johnson
 Flip Theron as Rev. Louw
 Albert Maritz as Rev. Bloemfontein
 Gert van Niekerk as Paul Johnson
 Chipi van der Merwe as Kortgiel Mostert
 Kobus Steyn as Chris Marneweck
 Lourens Potgieter as Danie
 David Pieters as Sam Gobbler
 Pieter Sherriff as Faan
 Tim Mahoney as Jimmy Kitchener
 Richard Farmer as Rev. Patrick Swindle
 Gordon van Rooyen as Col. Miller
 Nico de Beer as Mees Mouton

See also
 Arende (TV series)

References

External links
 
 Arende on YouTube

1994 films
1990s action war films
War films based on actual events
Second Boer War films
1994 drama films
Historical action films
Afrikaans-language films
Dutch-language films
English-language South African films
Films based on television series
Prisoner of war films
Films set on Saint Helena